Juršče (formerly Jurišče, in older sources Juršiče) is a village east of Pivka in the Inner Carniola region of Slovenia.

Name
Juršče was first mentioned in written sources as Jurshiz and Jurschiz in 1763–87. The name (a feminine plural) is derived from *Jurišiči, a plural form of the patronymic *Jurišič, based on the personal name Juriša. The name Juriša is derived from Jurij 'George', which also coincidentally matches the patron saint of the village church. However, there is no direct connection between the village name and the church name. The village was officially named Jurišče until 2007, when the name was changed to Juršče.

Church
The local church is dedicated to Saint George and belongs to the Parish of Trnje.

References

External links
Juršče on Geopedia

Populated places in the Municipality of Pivka